Fitsum Assefa Adela (born 12 May 1979) is an Ethiopian teacher and politician who leads the FDRE Minister of Planning and Development since 16 October 2018. Fitsum also has been a member of Commercial Bank of Ethiopia's Board of directors since 24 December 2018. She earned her undergraduate degree from Addis Abeba University in Accounting and Master of Arts in Development Studies from the same university. She completed her Doctor of Philosophy in Agricultural Economics at the University of Giessen, Germany, and taught more than a decade in the University of Hawassa. Fitsum is married and has 3 children.

References 

1979 births
Living people
Ethiopian politicians
Ministers for Planning and Development Commission
21st-century Ethiopian politicians
21st-century Ethiopian women politicians
Addis Ababa University alumni
University of Giessen alumni